The 2008 UEFA U-17 Championship qualifying round was the first round of qualification for the main tournament of the 2008 UEFA European Under-17 Championship. The top two teams from each group and the best two third-placed teams entered the 2008 UEFA European Under-17 Championship elite round.

Group 1

Group 2

Group 3

Group 4

Group 5

Group 6

Group 7

Group 8

Group 9

Group 10

Group 11

Group 12

Group 13

Third-placed teams
Slovenia and Sweden advanced for the elite round as the two best third-placed teams.

Qualification
UEFA European Under-17 Championship qualification